The  or  ('forgery-impeding typeface') is a sans serif typeface introduced for use on licence plates. Its monospaced letters and numbers are slightly disproportionate to prevent easy modification and to improve machine readability. It has been developed in Germany where it has been mandatory since November 2000.

The abbreviation "FE" is derived from the compound German adjective  combining the noun " ('falsification') and the verb  ('to hinder').  means 'font' in German (cognate with the English word script).

Development 
The motivation for the creation of the typeface arose in the late 1970s in the light of terrorism by the Red Army Faction when it was discovered that with the then-standard font for vehicle registration plates—the DIN 1451 font—it was particularly easy to modify letters by applying a small amount of black paint or tape. For example, it was easy to change a "P" to an "R" or "B", a "3" to an "8", or an "L" or "F" to an "E". Modifications to FE-font plates are somewhat more difficult, as they also require the use of white paint, which is easily distinguished at a distance from the retroreflective white background of the plate, in particular at night.

The typeface was slightly modified according to the results of tests that lasted from 1978 to 1980 at the University of Giessen (Department of Physiology and Cybernetic Psychology). For example, the initial slashed zero could be mistaken for an 8, so Hoefer replaced it by a design with a reduced white slash in the upper right corner. Faked  letters (e.g., "P" to "R") appear conspicuously disproportionate.

Another motivation for the new typeface came from a spike in the theft rate of license plates in the early 1970s. And despite the requirement to hinder falsification, the scope document did list that point only in the second place. The first priority was a requirement for readability by humans and machines as the decade was the same that saw the development of other typefaces for optical character recognition, namely OCR-A and OCR-B. The RAF terrorism however allowed to fund a project over a couple of years — running from the functional scope document being created in 1977 to the final decision of 1982 to not introduce the design on license plates. It ended up in the drawer.

The final publication in German law for the usage on license plates includes three variants – normal script with 75 mm high and 47.5 mm wide letters and 44.5 mm wide digits, narrow script with 75 mm high and 40.5 mm wide letters and 38.5 wide digits and a small script with 49 mm high and 31 mm wide letters and 29 mm wide digits. The legal typeface includes umlaut vowels as these occur in German county codes at the start of the license plate number. The narrow font allows nine characters to be put on a standard Euro license plate — shorter numbers are supposed to be printed with larger spaces between characters as to fill the available space on the plate.

Digital variants have never been published by them but there exist third party digitizations for free download, for example the font "Euro Plate".

Adoption process 
Its distribution was furthered by another event being the introduction of the Euro license plate. With the fall of the Iron Curtain there was again a spike in the theft rate of license plates, including cars being stolen and moved to Eastern Europe. Again there was a motivation to prevent that with new regulations on license plates. In the new process the officials found the FE-Schrift which was fully developed and a perfect match for the automatic number-plate recognition technology that had developed to a usable state at the time.

Some of the federal states in the eastern part of Germany introduced the new design during 1994 in anticipation of the national resolution. The shift in legislation matches with the first Schengen zone to lift borders during 1995. With the extension of the Schengen zone in 1998 the new license plate design found EU-wide acceptance (even for non-Schengen countries) thereby lifting the older requirement of adding an extra country code plate on the car when roaming to other countries which constitutes an advantage to citizens. Shortly later the option to be issued an old (non-Euro) license plate design were dropped on 1 November 2000 and the legislation dropped the older typeface for license plates alongside. The  is mandatory in Germany since that time although older license plates continue to be valid. There is an exception for historic cars to get a new license plate in the DIN typeface, and the  armed forces continue to generally issue their plates in the DIN typeface.

Taking over the original design, including the Euro license plate format, is generally cost effective – while in many countries the car license plates are produced by the state it is not the case in Germany. In Germany the car owner has to pay for a new license plate which gets a license stamp to be valid on the road (the round stamp is placed between county code and the local registration code). In the vicinity of the vehicle registration offices several small shops compete to press a license plate on the spot – their printing machines are highly standardized and the German license plate design is tailored to allow for cheap production in high quality.

Specifically in Europe some countries started to adopt the style of registration plates of the European Union even before becoming full members. The main difference is that EU registrations plates may bear a circle of stars as present in the European Union flag. The usage of stars is however completely optional, even after becoming a full member. The license plates may not need to be changed to be valid but new license plates may be issued with that hint to the EU membership.

In October 2014 the members of the Mercosur South American trade bloc agreed to introduce a common design for license plates. The design uses the narrow script  FE-Schrift design to show the registration code with 7 elements. The FE-Schrift was found to perform better against alteration and falsification in comparison to the Brazilian Mandatory script as shown in a test at the INTI. The design also includes a blue strip above the registration code with the Mercosur emblem in the left upper corner, the national flag of the member state in the right upper corner, and the country name printed in the center. It was agreed to introduce the Mercosur design by 2016. The actual introduction was delayed until 2018.

The early adoption in Africa is based on proposals against falsified and stolen license plates made by the German , which had also developed the retroreflective plates for Germany, and which was able to deliver the embossing machines for plates with FE-Schrift as they were already in mass production for the national market in 1994/95. In South Africa the empty license plates had been delivered with a special certification mark from the beginning, which would tell if a plate is authorized for embossing by licensed plate makers (today the certification mark contains a QR code). In other regions the car owner will get a third "license plate mark" being a sticker for the front window that can not be removed non-destructively and where the sticker does also contain all the license plate information (some of latest variants even integrate an RFID chip containing the information).

Usage 

 On Euro-style license plates with the country code in a blue section on the left:
 Germany – introduced in 1995 and are mandatory since 2000
 Bosnia and Herzegovina – in 2009 the new Euro-style license plate design was introduced along with the  typeface. The new design (dropping the national crest from the old Euro-style license plates as it was used since 1998) is more similar to the Euro license plate.
 Malta – since 2004, the Euro-style license plate design was introduced in 1995 without the FE-Schrift
 Cyprus – since 3 June 2013
 Akrotiri and Dhekelia – since 2014
 Northern Cyprus – since 2018
 Georgia – since 3 June 2013
 Latvia – for tractors and tractor trailers only. On passenger car, car trailer, and motorcycle plates, they continue to use DIN 1451.
The reasoning is to lower the cost while increasing the quality of the plates with the change to be completed by May 2016.
 Moldova – since 1 April 2015
 Hungary – since 1 July 2022, using a variant of the FE-Schrift (see picture)
 Common design in CIS countries with a region code section along with the country name and flag
 Uzbekistan – since 2009
 Armenia – since 2014
 Kyrgyzstan – since 2016
 Common design of Mercosur countries with the country name in a blue strip above the number:
The new license plate design is mandatory for Uruguay since 2011. Uruguay selected the blue strip of the Mercosur design in March 2015 for new license plates.
 Argentina – using the Mercosur design since 2016
 Paraguay – was scheduled to use the Mercosur design for new cars by 2016, but delayed the start to 2019.
 Brazil - using the Mercosur design since September 2018, first state was Rio de Janeiro
 Bolivia - since April 2017 it is allowed to get Mercosur-style license plates as they were defined 2014 in order to ease goods traffic with Peru
 Venezuela – with introduction date in the former Mercosur member state being unknown (Mercosur membership suspended since 2016)
 Countries in Africa:
 Namibia – since 1994, following South African style but with new registration codes that start with "N"
 Tanzania – started to introduce a new design in the 1990s using , registration codes start with "T"
 Uganda – since 1999, registration codes start with "U"
 Sierra Leone – probably since 1999
 Mozambique – probably around 2000, registration codes start with "M"
 Zambia – since 2000
 Ethiopia – probably since 2002, numbers only
 Cameroon – since 2005
 Zimbabwe – since 2006
 Rwanda – since 2007, registration codes start with "R"
 South Sudan – probably since 2007, initially only used on government vehicles
 Mali – probably since 2008
 Congo – since 2009
 Burundi – since April 2009
 Malawi – probably since 2011
 Senegal
 Gambia
 Guinea
 Ghana
 Niger
 Kenya - Since 2022

 Burundi
 Eswatini
 Sahara
 Somaliland
 Other countries:
 Sri Lanka – since August 2000, with a variation of the  developed by a German company
 Abu Dhabi in the United Arab Emirates – probably since 2006, numbers only
 Kuwait – probably since 2007, numbers only
 Guatemala – probably since 2008
 Bahrain – since 2010
 Peru – since 2010
 Chile – since 2014 
 Colombia – since 2016 for diplomatic cars only
 Honduras – since 2018
 Philippines – since February 2018 for regular plates and since 2010 for personalized plates
 Nepal – implemented since 2017 and fully since 2020
 Aruba – since 2019
 Indonesia – since August 2019 for personalised plates only., but at the end of 2022, it's also used for normal plates also.
 Australia – personalised "Euro plates" with FE-Schrift issued by some states, Victoria (2005) and New South Wales (2002).
 Iraq – since 2022 in Kurdistan
 Haiti - 2014-2022

Some license plates in Ghana have been issued using an FE-Schrift style. In Australia personalized plates may be issued with an FE-Schrift using a special design of vanity plates, others countries such as Algeria and Ireland where registration plates are owner provided FE-Schrift is permissible under their prescribed design regulations, likewise such plates were allowed in India until 2019.

Some countries have developed a typeface for license plates with similar features: Albania since 2002, Georgia since 2014, Guinea, New Zealand, Netherlands, Serbia, Slovenia (2004–2008),

Examples

See also 
 Mandatory (typeface)
 Vehicle registration plates of Germany

References 

Government typefaces
Sans-serif typefaces
Vehicle registration plates
OCR typefaces